Munir Hussain is a British businessman and community leader who was jailed for 30 months following an attack on a burglar who had broken into his home and threatened him and his family. There was a public outcry because the law was seen as being biased in favour of the burglar instead of the victim.

Personal background
Munir Hussain, 53 years old at the time, is married to Shaheen Begum, 49, has two sons Awais, 21 and Samad, 15, and two daughters, Farah, 25 and Arooj, 18. His brother Tokeer Hussain, 35, was also jailed for 39 months for taking part in the attack on the burglar. (Ages in 2009.)

Hussain trained as an engineer and runs Soundsorba Ltd, a High Wycombe-based business which employs 9 people and turns over £2.4 million per year. He had been chairman of the Wycombe Race Equality Council and chairman of the Asian Business Council, which he helped found. In 2004 Hussain won the Business Link small business of the year award.
Hussain was considered a leading figure in the town's voluntary organisations and was a major force in setting up the Green Street Community Centre in Desborough Street.

Confrontation with intruders and imprisonment
On 3 September 2008, during Ramadan, Mr. and Mrs. Hussain, their two sons and daughter Arooj, returned home to their house in High Wycombe, Buckinghamshire, England, from their mosque, when they were confronted and tied up by three masked intruders. Samad broke free, fleeing upstairs pursued by two of the masked men, and managed to raise the alarm. Meanwhile, Munir turned on the remaining intruder Walid Salem. Munir chased him off the premises and was joined by his brother Tokeer Hussain, who lived a few doors away. Munir and Tokeer brought Salem to the ground in a neighbour's front garden. Salem was then subjected to a ferocious attack which left him with a brain injury and a fractured skull. Witnesses said about four Asian men were seen battering Salem with implements including a hockey stick and cricket bat. One witness pleaded with the attackers to stop, telling them that they were going to kill the man on the ground, but she was disregarded.

At Reading Crown Court on 14 December 2009, Judge John Reddihough sentenced Munir Hussain to 30 months in prison whilst sentencing Tokeer to 39 months in prison (full transcript of judgement). Tokeer was given a harsher sentence because the judge said he had not faced as much provocation as his brother.

On 20 January 2010 the Court of Appeal reduced Munir's sentence to one year, suspended for two years, which meant he was immediately freed. Tokeer's sentence was reduced to two years, but not suspended, which meant he remained in prison. This ruling was criticised by some lawyers as paying too much attention to media attention and public outcry, and they claimed that the law worked well as it stood. Others, including Chris Grayling, the Conservative shadow Home Secretary, considered that the law should be changed.

It was later claimed that the motive for the break-in was not burglary, but that a man who (wrongly) believed his wife had had an affair with Munir Hussain had hired the three intruders to carry out an 'honour' attack. The wife stated there was no affair and that her only relationship with Munir was a business one, but her husband had become jealous because she had been happy at work. The wife is under police protection. The reports came as a surprise to the Hussains who believed the motive was robbery. However, during the Hussains' first trial, John Price QC, prosecuting, noted:

On 29 March 2010 at Reading Crown Court, Wahleed Hussain, Munir's nephew, was freed after the jury were unable to reach a verdict over a charge of grievous bodily harm with intent relating to the attack on Salem. After the trial had ended (the last involving members of the Hussain family) Munir Hussain spoke out against his treatment:

Contentious issues
The contentious issue is the reasonableness of the force used, related to the delay between Munir Hussain's breaking free and the attack on Walid Salem, and the degree of force used. Judge Reddihough made this clear in his original judgement, and the then director of public prosecutions, later leader of the Labour Party, Keir Starmer QC, said after the conviction of Munir.

Hence if there had been no time gap, and Salem had been subjected to a ferocious attack, or even killed, whilst Munir was breaking free, Munir would probably not have been charged. On the other hand, if Munir had had time to reflect on what had happened, and had then looked for Salem and beaten him up, his appeal would probably not have been successful, because it would have been considered a revenge attack. Unfortunately for Munir, English law treats the initial escape by Munir and the subsequent attack on Salem as two different incidents, although from Munir's point of view it could be argued there was no separation. The appeal succeeded (partially) because

Intruders
In September 2009, Walid Salem, then 57, was given a two-year non-custodial supervision order to the charge of false imprisonment of the Hussain family, as he was considered unfit to plead due to brain damage caused by the attack by Munir and Tokeer Hussain.

On 4 January 2009 Salem was arrested for a further five offences he was accused of committing after he had recovered from the attack. However, on 21 December 2009 he received an absolute discharge because he was deemed unfit to plead.

The other two intruders have not been apprehended.

Other cases
Other notable cases involving the use of force by victims:
Tony Martin (farmer)
Death of John Ward
Fred Hemstock
Omari Roberts

References

Living people
Crime in England
British prisoners and detainees
Prisoners and detainees of England and Wales
Year of birth missing (living people)